Cláudio Batista dos Santos (born April 19, 1967) is a former Brazilian football player.

Club statistics

References

External links

 
 

1967 births
Living people
Brazilian footballers
Brazilian expatriate footballers
Expatriate footballers in Japan
J1 League players
Cerezo Osaka players
Association football forwards